Kilmacsimon is a small village and townland situated on the banks of the River Bandon in County Cork, Ireland. Historical records list Killmcsimon in the Calendar of Patent Rolls of James I dated 1615.

The village has a pub and a community and activity centre which opened in May 2014. The local rowing club hosts the Kilmacsimon Water Carnival every year towards the end of June.

References 

Towns and villages in County Cork